July Reflections is a watercolor on seamed paper by Martha Burchfield that she made in 1972 in Buffalo, New York based on a pencil sketch.

References

Watercolor paintings
Martha Burchfield
1972 paintings
American Impressionism
Water in art